"All of My Life" is a ballad written by Richard Carpenter. The Carpenters recorded it for their 1969 album, Offering. The next year, it was used as the B-side song of the "We've Only Just Begun" single. Richard Carpenter did a remix of the song in 1987 with crisper vocals, a different electric piano, and more reverberation.

References 

1970 songs
The Carpenters songs
Songs written by Richard Carpenter (musician)